Luis Gerónimo Abreu Ascanio (born 7 September 1972 in Caracas, Venezuela) is a Venezuelan actor known for his performance in telenovelas.

Biography
Luis Gerónimo Abreu was born in Caracas on 7 September 1972 to Luis Abreu, an actor and theater director and Haydée Ascanio, television and film screenwriter and producer. He began his acting career at an early age through the influence of his parents that were in the performing arts.

His mother took him to several of her film sets, thereby exposing Luis to the world of acting. His first acting job was at the age of 5 years in the Román Chalbaud film  Bodas de papel alongside José Bardina and Marina Baura.

He started his television career with his participation in the Venevisión telenovela Amor de Abril starring Eduardo Serrano. After this, he dedicated his time in participating in small roles in television miniseries and forming part of production crews and management.

Later, he returned to telenovelas in 2001 by landing a role in Leoandro Padrón's telenovela Amantes de Luna Llena. This served as a platform for the start of his international career. He got a starring role in a Peruvian telenovela titled Éxtasis. Afterwards, he returned to Venezuela to participate in a movie titled Plan B and to enter the cast of telenovela Cosita Rica produced by Venevisión in 2003 which became a hit that year. He then travelled to Mexico to participate in the TV Azteca telenovela La hija del jardinero. From Mexico, he moved to Colombia to play a role in Telemundo's telenovela La Tormenta in 2005.

He returned to Venezuela to star in several Venevisión telenovelas such as Ciudad Bendita in 2006, Arroz con Leche in 2007 and La vida entera in 2008.

He obtained another starring role in 2009 in the telenovela Un Esposo para Estela alongside Daniela Alvarado. The telenovela was very successful in Venezuela where it maintained high broadcast ratings.

In 2011, he was cast as the protagonist in Martin Hahn's mystery telenovela alongside former beauty queen and Miss Venezuela winner Mariángel Ruiz in La viuda joven. The telenovela became a major hit that year.

In 2014, he was cast as the main protagonist of Venevisión's telenovela Corazón Esmeralda alongside Irene Esser, Flavia Gleske and Jorge Reyes.

Personal life
On 17 April 2010, Luis married his girlfriend, actress and model Claudia La Gata. Their wedding was televised live on the television show Super sábado sensacional. On January 17, the couple welcomed their first child, a son whom they named Salvador Abreu La Gatta.

Filmography

Film roles

Television roles

Theater
 Mátame (2013)

References

External links

Instagram Official
Twitter Official

Living people
1972 births
Male actors from Caracas
Venezuelan people of Portuguese descent
Venezuelan male film actors
Venezuelan male stage actors
Venezuelan male telenovela actors